Danthapuri is one of the historical place near Amadalavalasa. It is a village situated on the way from Amadalavalasa to Hiramandalam in Andhra Pradesh, India.

Buddhist Monuments
Ancient Buddha stupas are present in this place.  It is believed to be a place of Buddha religion and a shiddhardas living place. It is an important archeological place, called Boudha Gynana dantha puri, where the archeological department found some bricks, pots, nabbed wear, terracotta articles, bangles, beads, stone and iron articles. It is elevated in the BC 261 after Kalinga battle by Ashoka Chakravarthi. Kalinga kings made Danthapuri as capital of their region. The Boudha Gynana dantha collected and presented by Arhat Kheru Terudu to Brahmadatta Raja of Kalinga. Brahma Datta Kalinga Raja constructed a monument on Boudha Gyana Dahtha in this place so the place is called Danthapuri.

References 

 Srikakulam District Collectorate Portal.
 Srikakulam District , National Informatics Centre - Andhra Pradesh.

Villages in Srikakulam district
Buddhist buildings in India